Modeste Carlier (1820–1878) was a Belgian portrait and subject painter.

Life
Carlier was born at Quaregnon near Mons in 1820. He was a pupil of Picot. The collection of the Royal Museums of Fine Arts of Belgium includes his picture Locusta Experimenting with Poison on a Slave. He died in Ixelles in 1878.

References

Sources
 

1820 births
1878 deaths
People from Quaregnon
19th-century Belgian painters
19th-century Belgian male artists